is a traditional Okinawan song about Maitreya, a Buddhist bodhisattva. The song is named after the Ufuamushirare Temple in Akata Village, part of Shuri, Okinawa.

Overview

He was enshrined at the Ufuamushirare Temple near Shuri Castle and received royal patronage from the King of Ryukyu. The song, Akata Sundunchi, was sung during the Maitreya festival on the 16th day of the seventh month of the lunar calendar, which is now held on the Sunday closest to July 16. The festival disappeared during the late 20th century, but was revived and has been held annually since 1994. The song is usually accompanied by sanshin. It has become a popular children's song.

Lyrics
The second verse is sometimes placed after the third, and the fourth is sometimes absent.
 

Original text
　ぎてぃ
うりががりば　
Chorus
しーやーぷー　しーやーぷー　みーみんめー　みーみんめー
ひーじんとー　ひーじんとー　いーゆぬみー　いーゆぬみー
がりば　がちゅん
てぃり　
Chorus
だいくくぬ　がにもち
きぼせみそーり　
Chorus
ぬ　てぃぶ
ぬ　くなたさ
Chorus

Transliteration

Akata Sundunchi Kuganiduuruusa Giti
Uriga Aka Gariba Miruku Unkee
Chorus
Shiiyaapuu Shiiyaapuu Miiminmee Miiminmee
Hiijintoo Hijintoo Iiyunumii Iiyunumii
Agariaga Gariba Shiminaree Ga Ichun
Kashirayu Ti Taboori Wa Uganashi
Chorus
Daikuku Nu Miruku Wa Ga Shima Ni Imochi
Uka Kibosemisoori Miruku Yugafu
Chorus
Michimichi Nu Chimata Utauta Ti Ashibu
Miruku Yu Nu Yugafu Chikakunasa
Chorus

Translation
Inside Shuri Temple in Akata Village, hang a golden lantern
If it glows brightly, we'll beckon Maitreya Boddhisattva
Chorus
When the sun rises, I will go to school
Please put up your hair for my master
Chorus
Maitreya, please come to my island
Please spread the word of Maitreya's world peace
Chorus
Everyone there will sing songs
It seems that Maitreya's peaceful world is near
Chorus

References

Okinawan music
Buddhist music
Maitreya
Ryukyuan folk songs